Lawrence Leo "Snub" Mosley (December 29, 1905 – July 21, 1981) was an American jazz trombonist.

Biography
Mosley was born in Little Rock, Arkansas, United States. He played trombone in high school and then joined Alphonse Trent's territory band, playing with him from 1926 to 1933. Following this he played with the Jeter-Pillars Orchestra (1934), Claude Hopkins (1934–35), Fats Waller, and Louis Armstrong with the Luis Russell Orchestra (1936–37), in addition to playing with his own groups. After this Mosley settled in New York City.

Mosley spent most of his career on trombone, but also invented an instrument called the slide saxophone, which had both the slide portion of a trombone and a saxophone mouthpiece. The instrument is prominently featured in his 1940 recording The Man with the Funny Little Horn.

He recorded for Decca in 1940–1942, Sonora in 1946, Penguin in 1949, Columbia in 1959, and Pizza in 1978.

He died on July 21, 1981, at his home at 555 Edgecombe Avenue in Harlem.

References

Further reading
Scott Yanow, [ Snub Mosley] at Allmusic

1905 births
1981 deaths
American jazz trombonists
Male trombonists
20th-century American musicians
20th-century trombonists
Jazz musicians from Arkansas
20th-century American male musicians
American male jazz musicians